UFC 158: St-Pierre vs. Diaz was a mixed martial arts event held by the Ultimate Fighting Championship on March 16, 2013, at the Bell Centre in Montreal, Quebec, Canada.

Background
The main event was the culmination of the rivalry between Georges St-Pierre and Nick Diaz, with the latter having been vocal in wanting to fight the current champion for nearly two years.

A rematch between Alessio Sakara and Patrick Côté, from UFC 154, was briefly linked to this event. However, Sakara was forced out of the bout due to renal stress.

Sean Pierson was expected to face Rick Story at the event.  However, Pierson pulled out of the bout citing an injury and was replaced by Quinn Mulhern.

Rory MacDonald was originally scheduled to face Carlos Condit in a rematch.  However, on February 18, it was announced that MacDonald pulled out of the bout citing a neck injury.  Condit instead faced Johny Hendricks, who was pulled from his bout with Jake Ellenberger.  Ellenberger then faced returning veteran Nate Marquardt.

Mitch Gagnon was expected to face Issei Tamura at the event.  However, Gagnon was forced out of the bout with an injury and was replaced by T.J. Dillashaw.

Johnny Eduardo was expected to face Yves Jabouin at the event.  However, on March 6, Eduardo was forced to pull out of the bout citing a shoulder injury.  Jabouin was then pulled from the card as a suitable replacement could not be found on short notice.

Results

Bonus awards
Fighters were awarded $50,000 bonuses.
 Fight of the Night: Johny Hendricks vs. Carlos Condit
 Knockout of  the Night: Jake Ellenberger
 Submission of the Night: Not awarded as no matches ended by submission.

See also
List of UFC events
2013 in UFC

References

External links
Official UFC past events page
UFC events results at Sherdog.com

Ultimate Fighting Championship events
Events in Montreal
Mixed martial arts in Canada
Sports competitions in Montreal
2013 in mixed martial arts
2013 in Canadian sports